362nd or 362d may refer to:

362d Bombardment Squadron or 964th Airborne Air Control Squadron Constituted as the 362d Bombardment Squadron (Heavy) on 28 January 1942
362d Fighter Group or 128th Air Refueling Wing, unit of the Wisconsin Air National Guard, stationed at General Mitchell Air National Guard Base, Milwaukee, Wisconsin
362d Fighter Squadron, unit of the Ohio Air National Guard 178th Intelligence Surveillance and Reconnaissance Wing located at Springfield Air National Guard Base, Ohio
362d Tactical Electronic Warfare Squadron, inactive United States Air Force unit
362nd Signal Company ("Deuces Wild"), military communications company of the United States Army subordinate to the 41st Signal Battalion,  located at Seoul Air Base in South Korea

See also
362 (number)
362, the year 362 (CCCLXII) of the Julian calendar
362 BC